The Mark Twain Readers Award is given annually to a book for children in grades four through six.

Winner
Sounder by William Armstrong

Nominations
Search for Delicious by Natalie Babbitt 
Before You Came This Way by Byrd Baylor 
Mystery of Stonehenge by Franklyn M. Branley
Come Along by Rebecca Caudill 
Where the Lilies Bloom by Vera Cleaver & William Cleaver
Weathermonger by Peter Dickinson
Year of Columbus 1492 by Genevieve Foster 
King's Falcon by Paula Fox 
Portrait of Ivan by Paula Fox 
Cavalcade of Goblins by Alan Garner 
Knights and Armor by Shirley Glubok
Our Eddie by Sulsmith Ish-kishor
About the B'Nai Bagels by E. L. Konigsburg 
America's Endangered Wildlife by George Laycock
One to Grow On by Jean Little 
Odd Destiny by Milton Lomask
A Book of Ghosts and Goblins by Ruth Manning-Sanders 
Goodbye, Dove Square by Janet McNeill 
Tucker's Countryside by George Selden 
Journey Outside by Mary Q. Steele 
Trouble in the Jungle by John Rowe Townsend 
Thy Friend, Obadiah by Brinton Turkle

Mark Twain Awards